Ancylolomia micropalpella is a moth in the family Crambidae. It was described by Hans Georg Amsel in 1951. It is found in Iran, Bahrain, Saudi Arabia and the United Arab Emirates.

References

Ancylolomia
Moths described in 1951
Moths of Asia